Man of Steel may refer to:

Comics
 Superman, a DC Comics superhero nicknamed "Man of Steel"
 The Man of Steel (comics), a 1986 comic book limited series
 Superman: The Man of Steel, a monthly comic book series about Superman from 1991 to 2003

Film and television
 The Man of Steel (1922 film), a 1922 German silent drama film
 Man of Steel (film), a 2013 Superman film directed by Zack Snyder and starring Henry Cavill
 "Man of Steel" (Supergirl), a 2018 episode of Supergirl
 "Man of Steel" (Superman & Lois), a 2021 episode of Superman & Lois

Music
 Man of Steel (album), a 1983 album by Hank Williams, Jr.
 "Man of Steel" (Hank Williams Jr. song), 1984
 "Man of Steel" (Meat Loaf song), a 2003 song on Meat Loaf's album Couldn't Have Said It Better
 Man of Steel (soundtrack), the soundtrack to the film of the same name

People
 Joseph Stalin (1878–1953), Soviet revolutionary and leader whose nom de guerre (Stalin) is often translated as "Man of Steel"
 Narendra Chaudhary (soldier) (1968–2016), Indian bomb defusing expert nicknamed "Steel Man"

Other uses
 Man of Steel (musical), a 1978 Australian musical by Simon Denver and Ian Dorricott
 Man of Steel (sculpture), a proposed sculpture in South Yorkshire, England
 Man of Steel Awards, an annual award for Super League's player of the season in rugby league

See also

 Made of Steel (disambiguation)
 Woman of Steel (disambiguation)
 "Man of Steel, Woman of Kleenex", a 1969 essay about Superman's sexuality by Larry Niven
 Men of Steel (disambiguation)
 Man of Iron (disambiguation)
 Steelman (disambiguation)
 Superman (disambiguation)
 Superman: The Man of Steel (disambiguation)